Renewable energy in Germany is mainly based on wind and biomass, plus solar and hydro. Germany had the world's largest photovoltaic installed capacity until 2014, and as of 2021 it has over 58 GW. It is also the world's third country by installed total wind power capacity, 64 GW in 2021 (59 GW in 2018) and second for offshore wind, with over 7 GW. Germany has been called "the world's first major renewable energy economy".

The share of renewable electricity rose from just 3.4% of gross electricity consumption in 1990, provided by conventional hydro, to exceed 10% by 2005 thanks to additional biomass and wind, and reaching 42.1% of consumption in 2019.
As with most countries, the transition to renewable energy in the transport and heating and cooling sectors has been considerably slower.

According to official figures, around 370,000 people were employed in the renewable energy sector in 2010, particularly in small and medium-sized companies. This is over twice the number of jobs in 2004 (160,500). About two-thirds of these jobs are attributed to the Renewable Energy Sources Act.

Germany's federal government is working to increase renewable energy commercialization, with a particular focus on offshore wind farms. 
A major challenge is the development of sufficient network capacities for transmitting the power generated in the North Sea to the large industrial consumers in southern parts of the country. Germany's energy transition, the Energiewende, designates a significant change in energy policy from 2011. 
The term encompasses a reorientation of policy from supply to demand and a shift from centralized to distributed generation (for example, producing heat and power in very small cogeneration units), which should replace overproduction and avoidable energy consumption with energy-saving measures and increased efficiency.

Targets 

Since the passage of the Directive on Electricity Production from Renewable Energy Sources in 1997, Germany and the other states of the European Union were working towards a target of 12% renewable electricity by 2010. Germany passed this target early in 2007, when the renewable energy share in electricity consumption in Germany reached 14%. In September 2010, the German government announced ambitious energy targets:  After the 2013 elections, the new CDU/CSU and SPD coalition government continued the energy transition, with only minor modifications of its targets in the coalition agreement.
These targets include, for renewable energy:

The German Government reported, in 2011, renewable energy (mainly wind turbines and biomass plants) generated more than 123TWh of electricity, providing nearly 20% of the 603TWh of electricity supplied. By 2012, all renewable energy accounted for 21.9% of electricity, with wind turbines and photovoltaic providing 11.9% of the total.

As of 2017, renewable sources account for 38% of the net electricity production. Compared to the same period of 2016, energy production from renewable energy sources increased from 182 TWh to 210 TWh. It marks the first year where solar and wind are the biggest source of energy. Power production from nuclear power plants decreased by 10%, due to maintenance. Use of hard coal decreased by 16%, while production from lignite stayed on a similar level and increased for gas by 2.6 TWh.

The renewable installations have come under criticism as well. A balance made in 2017 has shown that whilst emissions in 2016 were 28 percent lower than 1990, the country was likely to fall short of its 2020 target of a 40 percent reduction on 1990 emission levels. The 40 percent reduction target of 2020 will not be met unless "spectacular" additional efforts are made. One significant reason why Germany may miss its 2020 target is because the country's electricity exports have been growing strongly in recent years to surpass France as Europe's largest electricity exporter. A recent study calculates that Germany exports the equivalent of the annual output from 7GW of lignite generation – producing 59 million tonnes of  emissions in the process, a figure which accounts for around half of the shortfall in  emissions it needs to meet its 2020 targets. Replacing the baseload power from fossil fuels has proven more challenging after nuclear power plants have been shut down although the proportion of electricity generated by coal for domestic use has been falling year on year.

In July 2019, figures published by the Fraunhofer Institute for Solar Energy Systems (ISE) report that renewable energy is for the first time providing more electricity than coal and nuclear power combined in Germany. Solar, wind, biomass and hydroelectric power generates nearly half of the country's output. Times with negative prices increased as solar and wind power increased. Solar and wind power has low marginal cost, and other production sources with higher fuel costs become less competitive when demand and prices are low. During the COVID-19 pandemic in Germany, solar power in Germany occasionally produced 32 gigawatt (GW). Solar, together with wind and other renewables, accounted for 78% of German power at one point.

Primary energy consumption 

As of 2015 Germany's primary energy consumption of 13 218 petajoules or 3 672 terawatt-hours refers to the total energy used by the nation.
The final renewable energy consumption, split by the sectors, and with their relative share, are:
Electricity sector, with a renewable energy consumption of 31.5% (187.364 GWh)
Heating sector, with a renewable energy consumption of 13.3% (158.662 GWh)
Transportation sector, with a renewable energy consumption of 5.3% (33.611 GWh)
As of the end of 2015, renewable energy sources, such as biomass, biogas, biofuels, hydro, wind and solar, accounted for 12.4% of the country's primary energy consumption, a more than doubling compared to 2004, when renewables only contributed 4.5%.

Although the terms "energy" and "electricity" are often used interchangeably, they should not be confused with one another, as electricity is only one form of energy and does not account for the energy consumed by combustion engines and heat boilers, used in transportation by vehicles and for the heating of buildings.

Sources 

A travel guide to renewable energy destinations in Germany was published in 2016.

Wind power 

In 2013, wind power generated a total of 53.4 TWh of electricity and more than 3.2 GW of new capacity was added to the grid. In 2011, the country's installed capacity of wind power reached 29,075 megawatts (MW), about 8% of the overall capacity. According to EWEA, in a normal wind year, installed wind capacity in Germany will meet 10.6% at end 2011 and 9.3% at end 2010 of the German electricity needs.

More than 21,607 wind turbines are located in the German federal area and the country has plans to build more. As of 2011, Germany's federal government is working on a new plan for increasing renewable energy commercialization, with a particular focus on offshore wind farms. A major challenge is the development of sufficient network capacities for transmitting the power generated in the North Sea to the large industrial consumers in southern Germany. In 2016, Germany decided to replace feed-in tariffs with auctions from 2017.

Biomass 

The key provider of biomass supply in Germany is supposed to be agriculture. Moreover, 40% of German wood production is also used as a biomass feedstock. The German Federal Research Centre for Forestry and Forest Products claims that there are also reserves which may assist in enlarging the part of forestry in biomass production. Agriculture is the main source of rapeseed oil, which is used for the production of biodiesel and making substrates for the production of biogas.

Biomass used for the production of biogas and biofuels are some of Germany's most important sources of renewable energy. In 2010, biomass accounted for 30% of renewable electricity generation and for 70% of all renewable energy (mostly wood).

Germany has committed to blending 6.25% biofuels in petroleum by 2014 with the Biofuels Quota Act.

Photovoltaic solar power 

Solar photovoltaic (PV) technology generates electricity from sunlight, and it can be used in grid-connected and off-grid applications. They were first mass-produced in the year 2000, when German environmentalists and Eurosolar have succeeded in obtaining the government support for the 100,000 roofs program. In July 2012, a cumulative installed total solar PV power of 29.7 GW was in place. Solar PV provided 18 TW·h in 2011, 3% of the total electricity demand. As solar power installations rise quickly, in first half of 2012, about 5.3% of the total electricity demand was covered by solar power. On Saturday 25 May 2012, solar power broke a new record high, feeding 22 GW into the power grid, or as much as 20 nuclear power stations. This jump above the 20 GW level was due to increased capacity and excellent weather conditions countrywide, and made up for half of the nation's electricity demand at midday. Germany was also the biggest expanding market for solar PV 2012, with 7.6 GW of newly connected systems. Some market analysts expect the solar electricity share could reach 25% by 2050. Price of PV systems has decreased more than 50% in 5 years since 2006.

Hydroelectricity 

The total installed hydroelectric capacity in Germany at the end of 2006 was 4.7 GW. Hydropower meets 3.5% of the electricity demand. Latest estimates show, in Germany in 2007, about 9,400 people were employed in the hydropower sector which generated a total turnover of €1.23 billion.

Geothermal power 

Geothermal power in Germany is expected to grow, mainly because of a law that benefits the production of geothermal electricity and guarantees a feed-in tariff.

Industry 

Germany's renewable energy sector is among the most innovative and successful worldwide. Enercon, Nordex, REpower Systems, Siemens, and Fuhrländer are wind-power companies based in Germany. Every third solar panel and every second wind rotor in Germany are German, and German turbines and generators used in hydro energy generation are among the most popular worldwide.

Nearly 800,000 people work in the German environment technology sector; an estimated 214,000 people work with renewables in Germany, up from 157,000 in 2004, an increase of 36%.
Estimated German jobs in renewable energy in 2012–2013 were about 370,000.

Siemens chief executive Peter Löscher believes Germany's target of generating 35% of its electricity from renewables by 2020 is achievable – and, most probably, profitable for Europe's largest engineering company. Its "environmental solutions" portfolio, which is firmly focused on renewables, is "already generating more than €27 billion a year, 35 per cent of Siemens’ total revenue, and the plan is to grow this to €40 billion by 2015". Ending its involvement in nuclear industry will boost the credibility of Siemens as a purveyor of "green technology".

Germany's main competitors in solar electricity are Japan, the US, and China. 
In the wind industry, it is Denmark, Spain, and the US.

Government policy 

The renewable energy sector benefited when the Alliance '90/The Greens party joined the federal government between 1998 and 2005. Support for renewable energy continued to some degree under the following governments, regardless of composition, including the current CDU/CSU and SPD coalition government starting in 2018 but did not prevent the collapse of German solar panel production. The renewable energy sector was aided initially by the Renewable Energy Sources Act that promotes renewable energy mainly by stipulating feed-in tariffs and recently also market premiums that grid operators must pay for renewable energy fed into the power grid; these premiums were reduced under governments without Green party participation. People who produce renewable energy can sell their 'product' at fixed prices for a period of 20 or 15 years. This has created a surge in the production of renewable energy.
In 2012, Siemens estimated the total cost of renewable energy would come to at least €1.4 trillion (US$1.8 trillion) by 2030.

For the 2011–2014 period, the federal government set aside 3.5 billion euros for scientific research in the country.
Additionally, in 2001 a law was passed requiring the closing of all nuclear power plants within a period of 32 years. The shutdown time was extended to 2040 by a new government in 2010. After the Fukushima incident, the law was abrogated and the end of nuclear energy was set to 2022. After the 2013 federal elections, the new CDU/CSU and SPD coalition in important areas continued the Energiewende of the previous government, but also agreed on a major revision of the EEG.

The German energy policy is framed within the European Union, and the March 2007 European Council in Brussels approved a mandatory energy plan that requires a 20% reduction of carbon dioxide emissions before the year 2020 and the consumption of renewable energies to be 20% of total EU consumption (compared to 7% in 2006). The accord indirectly acknowledged the role of nuclear energy — which is not commonly regarded as renewable, but emissions-free — in the reduction of the emission of greenhouse gases, allowing each member state to decide whether or not to use nuclear-generated electricity.

Also, a compromise was reached to achieve a minimum quota of 10% biofuels in the total consumption of gasoline and diesel in transport in 2020.

Energy transition 

Energiewende ("energy transition") designates a significant change in energy policy: The term encompasses a reorientation of policy from demand to supply and a shift from centralized to distributed generation (for example, producing heat and power in very small cogeneration units), which should replace overproduction and avoidable energy consumption with energy-saving measures and increased efficiency.

The key policy document outlining the Energiewende was published by the German government in September 2010, some six months before the Fukushima nuclear accident. In addition, there will be an associated research and development drive. Legislative support was passed in September 2010.  Important aspects include:

The policy has been embraced by the German federal government and has resulted in a huge expansion of renewables, particularly wind power. Germany's share of renewables has increased from around 5% in 1999 to 22.9% in 2012, reaching close to the OECD average of 18% usage of renewables. Producers have been guaranteed a fixed feed-in tariff for 20 years, guaranteeing a fixed income. Energy co-operatives have been created, and efforts were made to decentralize control and profits. The large energy companies have a disproportionately small share of the renewables market. Nuclear power plants were closed, and the existing nine plants will close earlier than planned, in 2022.

In May 2013, the International Energy Agency commended Germany for its commitment to developing a comprehensive energy transition strategy, ambitious renewable energy goals, and plans to increase efficient energy use and supported this approach. Nevertheless, the scale of Germany's energy policy ambitions, coupled with the large size and energy intensity of its economy, and its central location in Europe's energy system, mean further policy measures must be developed if the country's ambitious energy transition is to maintain a workable balance between sustainability, affordability, and competitiveness.

Subsidies aimed at stimulating the growth of renewables have driven up consumer energy prices by 12.5% in 2013. To date, German consumers have absorbed the costs of the Energiewende, but the IEA says the debate over the social and economic impacts of the new approach has become more prominent as the share of renewable energy has continued to grow alongside rising electricity prices. The transition to a low-carbon energy sector requires public acceptance, and, therefore, retail electricity prices must remain at an affordable level. Presently, German electricity prices are among the highest in Europe, despite relatively low wholesale prices. At the same time, the IEA said the new energy policy is based on long-term investment decisions, and a strong policy consensus in Germany in favour of large-scale renewable energy commercialisation exists.

The Energiewende has been subject to a number of computer studies. 
Most concentrate on electricity generation and consumption as this sector is undergoing a rapid transition in terms of technologies and institutions.

Ownership 

In Germany, almost half of renewable power capacity was citizen-owned as of 2013, and about 20 million Germans lived in so-called 100% renewable energy regions.

Statistics 

Increases in installed renewable electric power capacity and generation in recent years is shown in the charts and table below:

Public opinion

According to a 2017 national survey conducted for the German Renewable Energies Agency, of 1016 respondents 95% supported further expanding renewable energy. Almost two-thirds of the interviewees agreed to renewable power plants close to their homes, with the support increasing further if respondents already had experience with such plants in their neighborhood. With solar farms it increased from 72 to 94%, with wind power from 57 to 69%, and with biofuels from 39 to 56%.

See also

References

External links 
 European Commission National Renewable Energy Action Plans
 European Commission renewable energy Progress Reports
 European Commission National Energy Efficiency Energy Action Plans

External links

 2011 Renewable Energy Sources in Figures  from the Federal Ministry for the Environment, Nature Conservation and Nuclear Safety – Renewable Energy 
For German Homeowners, Renewable Energy is No Longer a Choice
Climate, Energy, and Environment Overview from the German Department of State 
Official site about renewable Energy in the Emscher-Lippe-Region